Black Knight is an upcoming South Korean streaming television series, written and directed by Cho Ui-seok, starring Kim Woo-bin, Esom and Kang Yoo-seok. The series based on Lee Yoon-gyun's webtoon Delivery Knight, depicts a dystopian future where air pollution has become serious and tells the story of delivery drivers who play a major role in the society. It is slated to release on Netflix in the second quarter of 2023.

Synopsis 
Black Knight is set in the year 2071, when it is impossible to live without a respirator due to extreme air pollution. With a majority of the Korean peninsula now a wasteland and only 1 per cent of its original population remaining, delivery drivers play a crucial role in the survival of its inhabitants. The legendary delivery man who goes by the name '5-8' with extraordinary fighting skills meets 'Sa-wol', a refugee who dreams of becoming a delivery driver, the only hope of refugees.

Cast 
 Kim Woo-bin as '5-8', a legendary courier
 Esom as Seol-ah, a military intelligence officer and lifesaver of Sa-wol
 Kang Yoo-seok as Sa-wol, a refugee boy who envies legendary '5-8'
 Song Seung-heon as Ryu Seok, the only heir to the Cheonmyeong Group that rules the world with oxygen as a weapon.
  Kim Eui-sung
 Jin Kyung
 Lee Hak-joo
 Lee Sang-hee
 Yu Seong-ju

References

External links
 
 
 

Korean-language Netflix original programming
2020s South Korean television series
Upcoming Netflix original programming 
2023 web series debuts
South Korean web series
2023 South Korean television series debuts
Television shows based on South Korean webtoons
Television series set in the 2070s
South Korean science fiction television series
2020s science fiction television series
Dystopian television series